Ludvig "Ludde" Strigeus (born  January 1981) is a Swedish programmer, best known for developing software such as the BitTorrent client μTorrent, OpenTTD, and Spotify.

Early life and education
Strigeus was born in January 1981, and he graduated from Chalmers University of Technology with a master's degree in computer science and engineering.

Career
He currently works as a software engineer at Spotify. In 2005, his development team won PuzzleCrack, a week-long puzzlehunt competition that combines problem-solving with computer hacking.

Ludvig Strigeus was awarded the 2006 John Ericsson (sv) Medal, the 2011 Tenzingpriset, 2015 honorary doctorate, and the 2020 Polhem Prize.

Personal life 
He currently resides in Gothenburg, Sweden. Due to a rare muscular disease, Strigeus uses a wheelchair.

Software 
 μTorrent - small footprint BitTorrent client for Microsoft Windows and OS X (closed-source)
 ScummVM - interpreter of adventure game engines, most notably LucasArts's SCUMM
 OpenTTD - reverse engineered game engine of Transport Tycoon, led to many ports and game improvements over the original
 Ports of Dr. Mario and Kwirk for the TI-89 calculator
 "The Idiot" - card game for Windows
 WebWorks - a text HTML editor
 Spotify - a commercial music streaming service
 Spotiamp - a lightweight Spotify Premium client for Windows, created as a tribute to Winamp
 TunSafe - VPN client for Windows using the WireGuard protocol

References

External links 
 SourceForge profile
 Patents by Inventor Ludvig Strigeus at Justia Patents

Video game programmers
Swedish computer programmers
Chalmers University of Technology alumni
1981 births
Living people
Spotify people